Josef Ivanović (born 5 December 1973 in Bielefeld) is a German football coach and a former player.  He also holds Croatian (or, according to other sources, Macedonian) citizenship. He is currently the manager of TuS Immendorf.

References

1973 births
Living people
German footballers
German football managers
Bundesliga players
2. Bundesliga players
Arminia Bielefeld players
SV Meppen players
1. FC Magdeburg players
Alemannia Aachen players
MSV Duisburg players
TuS Koblenz players
FC Sachsen Leipzig players
Sportspeople from Bielefeld
Association football forwards
Footballers from North Rhine-Westphalia